Ezhilmaaran known as  Ezhil is an Indian film director who works in the Tamil film industry. He has won 2 Tamil Nadu state awards.  He made his directorial debut with the 1999 romantic film Thulladha Manamum Thullum starring Vijay and Simran. His success streak continued with Pennin Manathai Thottu (2000), Poovellam Un Vasam (2001) and Deepavali (2007). He made a comeback in 2012 after a brief sabbatical with the Sivakarthikeyan starred film Manam Kothi Paravai which opened to moderate reviews from critics, but was a commercial hit. Film Directors Suseenthiran and Karu Pazhaniappan were his assistants.

Career
Ezhil, krishna an erstwhile assistant to Robert-Rajashekhar, Panneer and Parthiban, made his debut as a film-maker with Thulladha Manamum Thullum under R. B. Choudary's production house. Prior to release, the role of Vijay's mother in the film was kept under wraps with the media speculating who would play the role. Eventually, no actress played the role although the character played a pivotal part in the film. Vijay took a pay cut for the film, accepting only 3 million rupees instead of 5 million rupees, as he had signed the film before the release of his blockbuster Kadhalukku Mariyadhai. Initially Ezhil wanted comedian Vadivelu to play the lead role.  Vadivelu who was impressed with the story has said to Ezhil that the story line was too good and he doesn't know whether it will work with him in the lead. Vadivelu also asked Ezhil to wait for six months, if he didn't get anyone hero then he will act in it then he was replaced by Vijay.

The film went on to become a blockbuster, running for hundred days across dozens of theatres in Tamil Nadu, while it also enjoyed similar success in the neighbouring state of Kerala. Vijay and Ezhil immediately decided to follow up this film with another collaboration, Pennin Manathai Thottu, with either Isha Koppikar or Roja to be hired as the lead actress. However soon after pre-production, Vijay was replaced by Prabhu Deva and the film went on to release in 2000.

Ajith Kumar signed the film Poovellam Un Vasam in early 2001 after he pulled out of Praveenkanth's commercial film Star. The producers had initially approached Simran, Aishwarya Rai and then Preity Zinta to star, with their refusals leading to the casting of Jyothika. Miss World 2001, Yukta Mookhey was hired to appear in an item number. Ajith gained mass image before the filming so producer Ravichandran expressed his doubts to Ezhil about carrying on with such a family oriented film with an action hero like Ajith in hand. But Ezhil was confident about Ajith's capabilities in pulling off varying roles. The film opened to positive reviews with The Hindu critic labelling it as "reasonably interesting", with Ajith's performance being praised as "Ajith is natural and neat" with claims that "he has to work harder on his soliloquies and sad expressions". The success of the film prompted Ezhil, Ajith Kumar and Jyothika to team up for a venture the following year with Raja.

Producer Ambeth Kumar and Ranjeev Menon are friends of director Ezhil. When they asked him how the shooting of Manam Kothi Paravai was proceeding, he made them listen to the songs tuned by D. Imman. Impressed, they decided to produce it.

It was initially expected that Yuvan Shankar Raja, whom Ezhil had worked with in Deepavali, would compose the music, but as the budget of this film could not afford to have Yuvan as the music composer, Ezhil opted for D. Imman. After the lead role in Marina and an important role in the recently released 3, Sivakarthikeyan is taking up a full-fledged lead role again for Manam Kothi Paravai.

The film, which is set in a village, has been shot at Ezhil's native place Kayathur, near Mayavaram and Siva Karthikeyan's Thiruvizhimizhalai.

After a fairly successful outing with Manam Kothi Paravai, director Ezhil started his next titled Desingu Raja, which was in a similar genre rural comedy. He hired Vimal to play the lead Idhayakani, who has been named so by his parents and is a diehard MGR fan. Bindu Madhavi was signed to play the female lead as a Rajini fanatic in the movie, thus pairing with Vimal for second time after Kedi Billa Killadi Ranga. She said "I play a cheerful, naughty village girl". Muktha Bhanu danced for one song along with Vimal and the group dancers which was shot in Thiruvarur.

Filmography

References

External links

Tamil film directors
Living people
Film directors from Tamil Nadu
1964 births
20th-century Indian film directors
21st-century Indian film directors
People from Nagapattinam district